Jeff Shreve is an American public address announcer for the Cleveland Browns of the National Football League,  University of Akron football and men's basketball, the Mid-American Conference and the former public address announcer of the Cleveland Cavaliers of the National Basketball Association and the Canton Charge of the NBA G League.

Shreve was born in Canton, Ohio. He left GlenOak High School in 1983 and is a graduate of the University of Mount Union (1987).

Shreve became a full-time public address announcer at the beginning of the second season of Gund Arena in the 1995-96 NBA season. He was the voice of the 1997 NBA All-Star Game and the "NBA at 50" halftime ceremony honoring the 50 Greatest Players in NBA History. He was replaced by Ronnie Duncan after the 2004-05 NBA season as part of the team overhaul by the new owner, Dan Gilbert.

In 1999, Shreve was hired as the internal public address announcer for the Cleveland Browns and replaced Jim Mueller as the full-time stadium announcer in 2000.

Shreve was the public address announcer for the Cleveland Rockers of the WNBA for all of their seven seasons (1997-2003). He has also been the announcer for the Mid-American Conference men's and women's basketball tournaments since 2000 and the Mid-American Conference Football Championship game since 2012.

References

External links

 NBA 50 Greatest Players (1997 NBA All-Star Game)
 "Manning the microphone at Browns Stadium a big voice, small profile post" at cleveland.com
 "Jeff Shreve is the Man Behind the Stadium Mic" at Canton Repository
 "Shreve Joins FridayNightOhio.com Broadcast Team on FridayNightOhio.com"
 John Carroll at Mount Union Football Highlights
 Dick Snyder Court Dedication 2021

Living people
American sports announcers
Cleveland Cavaliers
Cleveland Browns
Canton Charge
University of Akron people
University of Mount Union alumni
Mid-American Conference
National Basketball Association public address announcers
National Football League public address announcers
Public address announcers
1965 births